Enrique van Rysselberghe Herrera (born 17 September 1976) is a Chilean politician and engineer.

He is a member of the Independent Democratic Union (UDI) and currently serves as deputy for the 20th district (2018-2022 term). He is the son of deputy Enrique van Rysselberghe Varela and brother of the former mayor, councilor, intendant and senator Jacqueline van Rysselberghe.

From 2010 to 2018, he served as deputy for the former 44th district for two consecutive terms. Previously, he was a councilor for the commune of Concepción between 2008 and 2009. In 2021 he was elected senator for Biobío.

References

External links
 Profile at Chamber of Deputies

1976 births
Living people
Chilean engineers
University for Development alumni
Independent Democratic Union politicians
21st-century Chilean politicians
People from Concepción, Chile
Members of the Chamber of Deputies of Chile
Chilean people of Flemish descent
Chilean people of Dutch descent